Thomas Symington Carlyon (27 April 1902 – 14 March 1982) was an Australian rules footballer who played with St Kilda in the Victorian Football League (VFL).

Notes

External links 

1902 births
1982 deaths
Australian rules footballers from Ballarat
St Kilda Football Club players